The Tabernacle in Scottsville, Kentucky was built in 1912.  It was listed on the National Register of Historic Places in 2001.

It is a large wood-frame square-plan structure constructed by J. M. Guthrie to be "used for revivals, church association meetings and conferences, singing conventions and 'meetings for all good purposes.'" It was originally open on one side until it was enclosed in 1938 as part of a National Youth Administration project during the Depression. In Methodism, a "tabernacle" serves as the center of a camp meeting.

References

National Register of Historic Places in Allen County, Kentucky
Religious buildings and structures completed in 1912
1912 establishments in Kentucky
Event venues on the National Register of Historic Places in Kentucky
Event venues established in 1912
National Youth Administration
New Deal in Kentucky
Tabernacles (Methodist)